Nokhtalu District is in Baruq County, West Azerbaijan province, Iran. At the 2006 National Census, the region's population (as a part of the former Baruq District of Miandoab County) was 8,258 in 1,768 households. The following census in 2011 counted 6,872 people in 1,801 households. At the latest census in 2016, there were 6,585 inhabitants in 1,949 households.

After the census, Baruq District was separated from Miandoab County, elevated to the status of a county, and divided into two parts: the Central and Nokhtalu Districts.

References 

Districts of West Azerbaijan Province

Populated places in West Azerbaijan Province

fa:بخش نختالو